What a Wonderful Game is a 1995 Russian drama film directed by Pyotr Todorovsky. It was entered into the 19th Moscow International Film Festival.

Cast
 Andrey Ilin as Felix Raevskiy
 Gennady Nazarov as Kolya Rybkin
 Denis Konstantinov as Fedya Grinevich
 Gennadi Mitnik as Elizbar Radchaninov (voice by Sergei Chekan)
 Elena Yakovleva as Vera Markelova
 Yuriy Kuznetsov as Filimon Semenovich
 Larisa Udovichenko as Sophia Abramovna
 Nikolay Burlyaev as Mikhail Mikhailovich
 Maria Shukshina as Olya
 Darya Volga as Julia
 Elena Kotikhina as Mikhail Mikhailovich's mistress
 Dmitry Maryanov as Lev
 Aleksei Zolotnitsky as KGB captain
 Valentina Berezutskaya as the controller in the train
 Mikhail Dorozhkin as Yuri Shevtsov
 Aleksandr Oleshko as clarinettist
 Nina Agapova as teacher of English language

References

External links
 

1995 films
1995 drama films
Russian drama films
1990s Russian-language films
Mosfilm films
Films directed by Pyotr Todorovsky